Nanya may refer to :

Nanya (c.1835 – 1895) an Australian aboriginal man.
Nanya Night Market, a market in Taiwan
Nanya Technology Corporation, a Taiwanese semiconductor (DRAM) manufacturer
Nanya Institute of Technology, a private college in Taiwan
Nanya River, a river in Sichuan, China; tributary of the Yangtze